Tinner Hill is an historic area of Falls Church, Virginia, named after Charles and Mary Tinner, an African-American couple who bought land there in the late 19th century. Family members quarried stone used in many buildings nearby.  Between 1910 and 1918, their descendant  Joseph Tinner and Edwin Bancroft Henderson fought for civil rights and helped found the first rural branch of the National Association for the Advancement of Colored People.

NAACP at Tinner Hill 
In 1915, Joseph Tinner and Dr. Edwin B. Henderson (already a NAACP member in Washington D.C. and who had spent summers with his grandmother in this area before moving there with his wife in 1910) organized the Colored Citizens Protective League (CCPL). This responded to a new Falls Church town ordinance mandating residential racial segregation, as allowed pursuant to legislation passed by the Virginia General Assembly in 1912. Falls Church wanted to restrict African-Americans to the area south of Fairfax Street, Liberty and Douglass Avenues, which according to a special survey had 53 colored and 8 white residents, while 1,212 white and 113 colored residents lived in the rest of the town.  The CCPL filed a lawsuit to block enforcement, and were successful in the Supreme Court of Virginia. However, educational segregation persisted, and Henderson later recalled that Falls Church soon ceded the area to Fairfax County (according to him to eliminate them as potential Republican voters). In 1917 the U.S. Supreme Court decided Buchanan v. Warley, blocking similar state residential segregation laws.

In addition to engaging in a letter writing campaign against the ordinance, Dr. Henderson requested a charter for a local branch of the NAACP, although the first six branches since the NAACP's founding in 1909 were all in cities. The NAACP first allowed the CCPL to operate a standing committee. In 1918, the NAACP granted the CCPL a charter which allowed it to form the Falls Church and Vicinity NAACP. The first rural branch had about 40 members and 8 officers, including Tinner as the first president, and Henderson as secretary. In 1944 the NAACP issued the branch a new charter as the "Fairfax County Branch."

Memorials 

Tinner Hill has two memorial sites.  A park with explanatory signage, a picnic area, and a memorial river sculpture adjoins the former Tinner residence.  There is also a stone arch at the intersection of Washington Avenue and Tinner Hill Road.  The arch was erected by the Tinner Hill Heritage Foundation in 1999, with additional signage honoring Joseph Tinner and E.B. Henderson. The fifteen-foot monument of pink granite (trondhjemite) also honors the men and women of Tinner Hill and the NAACP's first rural branch.  One of the plaques nearby is missing since the luxury apartments were built behind it.  The City Council of Falls Church has drawn criticism for allowing high-density apartment buildings for affluent residents to overshadow the Tinner Hill monument.

The stone used in the arch was retrieved from demolished buildings built with granite that Tinner quarried, cut and masoned in Falls Church prior to 1922. The monument also pays homage to Joseph Tinner's greatest stonework, a large stand-alone arch that once stood about two miles away at Seven Corners. That arch was demolished decades ago during construction of a car dealership. Local high school art teacher John Ballou drew the concept design; with the assistance of architect Mark Coupard and Structural Engineer Guy Razzi. The monument was designed so that it can not be disassembled without destruction; the rock is now irreplaceable, as all remaining local trondhjemite is too friable to use in a stand-alone arch. The masonry for the monument was crafted by Roy Morgan of Washington, D.C. and James Ware of Virginia.

Piedmont Blues guitarist/singer John Jackson headlined the original dedication ceremony.  A thirty-minute film "The Making of a Monument" by Dave Eckert shows how the arch was made. Another short film "Tinner Hill" by Bob Burnett provides a more in-depth story about the history and people of Tinner Hill.

Tinner Blues Festival 
Since 1993, the annual Tinner Blues Festival takes place on the second Saturday of June several blocks away in Cherry Hill Park in what is now the City of Falls Church. Many national and area blues musicians play at the event, which also honors Jackson's memory.

References

External links
Tinner Hill Heritage Foundation
African American Heritage site; "The Making of a Monument" video by Dave Eckert

Falls Church, Virginia
History of African-American civil rights
African-American history of Virginia